Kostas Papadakis may refer to:
 Kostas Papadakis (violinist)
 Kostas Papadakis (basketball)